Lester Boyd "Buddy" Gatewood (May 30, 1921 – April 9, 1965) was a center in the National Football League. He played for the Green Bay Packers.

Biography
Gatewood was born in Dallas, Texas, and played college football at Baylor University and Tulane University. He was drafted by the Green Bay Packers in the eighth round of the 1943 NFL Draft and played two seasons with the team. He died in Oklahoma City, Oklahoma at the age of 43 from a heart attack.

See also
List of Green Bay Packers players

References

External links
 

1921 births
1965 deaths
American football centers
Baylor Bears football players
Green Bay Packers players
Tulane Green Wave football players
Sportspeople from Dallas
Players of American football from Dallas